The Uşak Express, numbered B37, is a  long regional passenger train operated by the Turkish State Railways, running from Basmane Terminal in İzmir to the town of Uşak. The train operates daily in each direction. Schedulled journey time is 5 hours and 35 minutes.

Consists
İzmir-Uşak regional train had many consists in the past. This is the current consist:

TCDD MT15400 diesel multiple unit, in 4-car formation

Turkish State Railways